Pierre-André Taguieff (born 4 August 1946) is a French philosopher who has specialised in the study of racism and antisemitism. He is the director of research at the French National Centre for Scientific Research in an Institut d'Etudes Politiques de Paris laboratory, the Centre for Political Research. He is also a member of the Cercle de l'Oratoire think tank.

Taguieff is the author of a number of books and papers on racism and antisemitism, including The Force of Prejudice: On Racism and Its Doubles (2001) and Rising from the Muck: The New Antisemitism in Europe (2004). He is known in particular for his studies on the French National Front and populism.

Beliefs and works

On racism 
In La Force du préjugé – essai sur le racisme et ses doubles (1987), Taguieff analyzed several different types of racism:
 The first type of racism is against miscegenation, in favor of racial segregation, and wants to preserve differences between various alleged races. 19th century racialism theories, such as Arthur de Gobineau's An Essay on the Inequality of the Human Races (1853–55), are an example of this type of racism, which pretends to be founded on science and on the existence of biological human races. In other words, this pseudo-scientific racism mistakes differences in the amount of melanin (which determines skin color) for racial differences.
 The second type is insidiously hosted by the Enlightenment philosophy of universalism: its dream of unity of mankind may bring it, in specific and extreme cases, to the will to annihilate all cultural differences, amounting to effective genocide or ethnocides. Taguieff's point is not in declaring that the Enlightenment philosophy is racist in itself, but extreme forms of this will of universality may lead, in practice, to the destruction of the plurality of cultures and to the rejection of even moderate forms of multiculturalism.
 The third and more recent type has integrated the cultural relativists' attacks against racism. This new form of racism has reversed the famous anti-racist arguments of ethnologist Claude Lévi-Strauss. According to Lévi-Strauss, different cultures are incommensurable, and, because of this, each one thinks progress and superiority is on its side - Lévi-Strauss, in his 1952 essay for the UNESCO, used the famous metaphor of two trains crossing each other's path: each one thinks he is going the right way, while the other seems not to move or to move backward. Because of this, ethnocentrism is a necessary optical illusion, which in turn racist discourse uses to justify itself.

Taguieff was himself accused of racism on several occasions, for instance when he praised Oriana Fallaci's book The Rage and the Pride. He was also criticized for his contribution to the controversial website Dreuz info, which French newspaper Le Monde described as ultra zionist and islamophobic.

On the Nouvelle Droite's discourse 
According to Taguieff, racist discourse, such as that supported by Alain de Benoist's Nouvelle Droite far-right movement, has accepted the theories of cultural relativism and the non-existence of biological race. Claiming to uphold cultural relativism and thus antiracism, this new racist discourse in fact reiterates the strict distinction of various ethnic groups and segregation between them.

Since it argues that "ethnic groups" exist but are not biological races, it claims not to be racist. However, apart from the pseudo-scientific racist theories of the 19th century, it espouses an anti-assimilationist point of view in completely rejecting the notion of a social melting pot. Arguing that the Enlightenment's philosophy of universality, taken to extremes, is a form of racism, it pretends to be antiracist by preaching strict separation of ethnic groups. However, if the critics of "universal racism" are correct, it is clear that this new form of racism is descended in a direct line from the old discourse of separation between different supposed races.

About antisemitism and The Protocols of the Elders of Zion 
Taguieff is also very interested in the work of Leon Poliakov and Norman Cohn and has worked a great deal on the antisemitic forgery The Protocols of the Elders of Zion. Today he works on nationalism, the future of the Republic, and the concept of progress.

Pierre-André Taguieff's denunciation of antisemitism and of the instrumentalisation of anti-Zionism by specific ultra-minority groups has caused controversy, his opponents claiming that he was identifying anti-Zionism with antisemitism. However, Pierre-André Taguieff is a staunch opponent of any form of communitarianism whatsoever. As such, he does not claim that anti-Zionism is necessarily antisemitism, but simply that in some Islamist circles, explicit anti-Zionism may dissimulate implicit antisemitism, in the pure tradition of the European history of antisemitism.

Despite its contrast to conservatism (he is a former situationist close to René Viénet), Pierre-André Taguieff wrote Les Contre-réactionnaires in 2007, in which he opposed both antiracism and antifascism. He considers them as ideologies which are instrumentalized by far-left groups "aiming to regularize as many illegal immigrants as possible without any regulation".

Bibliography 

 Racismes, antiracismes (edited by André Béjin, Julien Freund ; with Alain de Benoist et al.), 1986 
 La Force du préjugé. Essai sur le racisme et ses doubles, Paris, La Découverte, "Armillaire", 1988 ; rééd. Gallimard, "Tel", 1990. 
The force of prejudice: on racism and its doubles. University of Minnesota Press, 2001. , 
 The New Cultural Racism in France, Telos 83 (Spring 1990). New York: Telos Press.
 (dir.), Face au racisme, t. 1, Les moyens d'agir ; t. 2, Analyses, hypothèses, perspectives, Paris, La Découverte, "Cahiers libres, essais", 1991 ; rééd. Paris, Seuil, "Points essais", 2 t., 1993. 
 (co-directed with Gil Delannoi), Théories du nationalisme, Paris, Kimé, "Histoire des idées, théorie politique et recherches en sciences sociales", 1991. 
 (dir. and ed.), Les Protocoles des sages de Sion. Faux et usages d'un faux, t. I, Introduction à l'étude des "Protocoles" : un faux et ses usages dans le siècle, t. II, Études et documents, Paris, Berg International, "Faits et représentations", 1992 ; new edition, Berg International et Fayard, 2004. 
 Sur la Nouvelle Droite. Jalons d'une analyse critique, Paris, Galilée, "Descartes et Cie", 1994. 
 Les Fins de l’antiracisme, Paris, Michalon, 1995. 
 La République menacée. Entretien avec Philippe Petit, Paris, Textuel, "Conversations pour demain", 1996. 
 Le Racisme. Un exposé pour comprendre, un essai pour réfléchir , Paris, Flammarion, "Dominos", 1998. 
 (with Michèle Tribalat), Face au Front national. Arguments pour une contre-offensive, Paris, La Découverte, 1998. 
 La Couleur et le sang : doctrines racistes à la française, Paris, Mille et une Nuits, "Les petits libres", 1998 ; new edition, coll. "Essai Mille et une Nuits", 2002. 
 (with Grégoire Kauffmann and Michaël Lenoire, dir.), L'Antisémitisme de plume (1940–1944). La propagande antisémite en France sous l'Occupation. Études et documents, Paris, Berg International, "Pensée politique et sciences", 1999. 
 L’Effacement de l’avenir, Paris, Galilée, "Débats", 2000. 
 Résister au bougisme. Démocratie forte contre mondialisation techno-marchande, Paris, Mille et une Nuits, "Essai", 2001. 
 (co-directed with Gil Delannoi), Nationalismes en perspective, Paris, Berg International, "Pensée politique et sciences sociales", 2001. 
 Du Progrès. Biographie d’une utopie moderne, Paris, EJL, "Librio", 2001. 
 La Nouvelle judéophobie, Paris, Mille et une Nuits, "Essai", 2002. 
Rising from the muck: The New anti-Semitisme in Europe. Ivan R. Dee, 2004.
 L'Illusion populiste : de l'archaïque au médiatique, Paris, Berg International, "Pensée politique et sciences sociales", 2002 ; new edition : L'Illusion populiste. Essais sur les démagogies de l'âge démocratique, Paris, Flammarion, "Champs", 2007. 
 (dir.), Le Retour du populisme. Un défi pour les démocraties européennes, Paris, Encyclopedia Universalis, "Le tour du sujet", 2004. 
 Le Sens du progrès. Une approche historique et philosophique, Paris, Flammarion, "Champs", 2004 ; 2006. 
"Does progress have a future?", A conversation with Pierre-André Taguieff, in Queen's Quarterly, December 22, #111, 2004.
 Prêcheurs de haine. Traversée de la judéophobie planétaire, Paris, Mille et une Nuits, "Essai", 2004.
 L'Illusion antifasciste. La Gauche et le Terrorisme intellectuel à la française, Paris, Mille et une Nuits, 2004 (articles).
 La République enlisée. Pluralisme, communautarisme et citoyenneté, Paris Éditions des Syrtes, 2005. 
 La Foire aux illuminés. Ésotérisme, théorie du complot, extrêmisme, Paris, Mille et une nuits, 2005. 
 L'Imaginaire du complot mondial. Aspects d'un mythe moderne, Paris, Mille et une nuits, 2007. 
 Les Contre-réactionnaires. Le progressisme entre illusion et imposture, Paris, Denoël, 2007. 
 Julien Freund, au cœur du politique, La Table ronde, Paris, 2008.

See also 
 Protocols of Zion (film)

Notes

External links 
 Pierre-André Taguieff on the new "anti-Zionism"
 About Pierre-André Taguieff : The Force of Prejudice. On Racism and Its Doubles
 Rethinking anti-Racism by Pierre-André Taguieff 
 "The Illuminati fair: Esotericism, Plot Theory, Extremism"

1946 births
Living people
Writers from Paris
Sciences Po alumni
French people of Russian descent
French people of Polish descent
French political scientists
Social philosophers
20th-century French philosophers
21st-century French philosophers
Protocols of the Elders of Zion
Populism scholars
20th-century French essayists
21st-century French essayists
Academic staff of the School for Advanced Studies in the Social Sciences
Academics and writers on far-right extremism
French National Centre for Scientific Research scientists